Business Interstate 27-U (Bus. I-27-U) is a business loop in the US state of Texas. It stretches  along Columbia Street through Plainview between exits 45 and 53 on Interstate 27 (I-27). The highway follows the original alignment of U.S. Route 87 (US 87) prior to the construction of the new freeway to the west. Before becoming Bus. I-27-U, it was designated as Loop 445 and signed as a business route of US 87. Along the way, it intersects Farm to Market Road 3466 (FM 3466, South 4th Street), US 70 (5th Street), and FM 1767 (34th Street).

History
The highway follows the original routing of US 87 through the city of Plainview. When the new US 87 freeway was built to the west, this segment was redesignated Loop 445, the Plainview Loop, on January 31, 1967, and marked as a business route of US 87. On June 21, 1990, Loop 445 was redesignated Bus. I-27-U.

Route description
Bus. I-27-U leaves I-27 south of Plainview at exit 45 and heads northeast toward the city. The highway begins as a four-lane road, with a wide median dividing the two directions. The road passes through several miles of farmland before entering Plainview and passing the Hale County Jail. The roadway continues past a small elementary school, several residential streets, the Hale County Airport, and an auto junkyard before intersecting with US 70 in downtown Plainview. The highway continues through downtown, intersecting several city blocks, and passing several parks and businesses. In the northern section of downtown, the road passes a small railroad depot, and a set of railroad tracks come alongside the eastbound lanes of the highway. The highway continues north from there, passing several more residential streets before intersecting I-27 in the northern region of Plainview. This intersection is the highway's northern terminus.

Junction list

References

27 Business (Plainview)
27 Business (Plainview, Texas)
Transportation in Hale County, Texas
Business (Plainview, Texas)
U.S. Route 87